Max Fenichel (2 July 1885 in Tarnów, Austria-Hungary – 16 September 1942 in the Łódź Ghetto), also known as Maximilian Fenichel and Menasche (or Menasse) Fenichel, was an Austrian photographer.

Biography
Menasche Fenichel, professionally known as Max Fenichel, moved to Vienna at the beginning of the First World War. He worked as a photographer in Vienna from 1915 to 1938. His first studio was located at Stolzenthalergasse 22 and then from 1917 in Gaullachergasse 13. His wife, Leopoldine (nee Hirsch), had been born in Vienna on 20 February 1893. 

He shot photos for the daily newspaper Die Stunde (The Hour) and the magazine Die Bühne (The Stage). His photojournalism was also published in Wiener Illustrierten Zeitung, Mikrophon, Illustrierte Kronen Zeitung, Moderne Welt, Österreichische Illustrierte Zeitung, Radio Wien, Wiener Bilder and Das interessante Blatt. 

Fenichel was a member of the Genossenschaft der Photographen in Wien (Vienna Photographic Cooperative) and the Organisation der Wiener Presse (Vienna Press Association). 

He also shot formal portraits in his studio, especially of professionals such as rabbis, writers, artists, and performers. Among those who sat for him were the writers Vicki Baum and Ernst Lissauer, Rabbi Max Grunwald, and the painter Ludwig Michalek.

Fate under the Nazis
Fenichel was Jewish, and after the annexation of Austria by the Nazis in 1938 he had to give up his photo studio. He and his wife were deported to the Lodz ghetto on 19 October 1941 on Transport 7, Train Da 5. Both were murdered in September 1942.

References

Further reading
Lesák Barbara (Hg.), Von der Pose zum Ausdruck. Theaterfotografie 1900-1930, Ausstellungskatalog Österreichisches Theatermuseum, Wien 2003.
Holzer, Anton. "Der zaghafte Aufbruch in die Moderne: Fotografie in Österreich 1900-1938". Fotogeschichte 113. Marburg: Jonas, 2009, pp. 21-48.

Austrian photographers
Austrian photojournalists
Jewish artists
Austrian Jews
People who died in the Łódź Ghetto
Artists from Vienna
1885 births
1942 deaths
Austrian Jews who died in the Holocaust